Idkerberget is a locality in Borlänge Municipality, Dalarna County, Sweden with 290 inhabitants in 2010.

References 

Populated places in Dalarna County
Populated places in Borlänge Municipality